Elatobium is a genus of insects in the family Aphididae containing five species of aphids that feed on the foliage of trees.

Species
The genus includes five species:
Elatobium abietinum which feeds on Picea in Europe and elsewhere
Elatobium hidaense which feeds on Salix in Japan and Kamschatica 
Elatobium laricis which feeds on Larix sibirica in east Siberia 
Elatobium momii which feeds on Abies firma, Picea jezoensis and Taxus cuspidata in Japan 
Elatobium trochodendri which feeds on Trochodendron aralioides in Japan

References

Aphidinae